Le Rappel (French for "the Recall") was a French daily newspaper founded in 1869 by Victor Hugo's sons Charles and François-Victor and three others. It was published from the end of the French Second Empire until 1933. At the start of the Third Republic, it embodied a radical-republican tendency and as such was highly contested by the French government.

Publication history 
The newspaper, which benefited from the law of 11 May 1868 on freedom of press, was founded on the initiative of Victor Hugo on the eve of the general elections of 1868. Le Rappel was started on 4 May 1869, with Charles and François-Victor Hugo, Auguste Vacquerie, and Paul Meurice as its principal contributors.

As a contribution to the first issue, Victor Hugo wrote a manifesto consisting of an address to the five co-editors:

Impact and influence
Le Rappel quickly became one of the major organs of early radicalism, opposing Napoleon III's empire but also denouncing crimes happening around Europe at the time. On 29 August 1876, Victor Hugo denounced the massacre of Serbs by the Ottoman Empire in a long editorial called , protesting against the impassivity of European governments. On 27 April 1881, after Jews were slaughtered and driven out of the city of Yelisavetgrad in Russia, Victor Hugo used Le Rappel to denounce the pogrom and to express fury at the massacre.

Notable contributors
Notable contributors have included:

References

External links
 Digitized issues of Le Rappel  (BnF)

1869 establishments in France
1933 disestablishments in France
Defunct newspapers published in France
Victor Hugo
Newspapers published in Paris
Publications established in 1869
Publications disestablished in 1933
Daily newspapers published in France